Bahrain competed in the Olympic Games for the first time at the 1984 Summer Olympics in Los Angeles, United States. Ten competitors, all men, took part in eight events in four sports.

Athletics

Modern pentathlon

Three male pentathletes represented Bahrain in 1984.

Individual
 Saleh Sultan Faraj
 Abdul Rahman Jassim
 Nabeel Saleh Mubarak

Team
 Saleh Sultan Faraj
 Abdul Rahman Jassim
 Nabeel Saleh Mubarak

Shooting

Swimming

Men's 100m Freestyle
Hamad Bader
 Heat — 58.16 (→ did not advance, 61st place)

Men's 100m Butterfly
Esa Fadel
 Heat — 1:13.27 (→ did not advance, 52nd place)

References

External links
Official Olympic Reports

Nations at the 1984 Summer Olympics
1984
Summer Olympics